The Chrysler Museum of Art is an art museum on the border between downtown and the Ghent district of Norfolk, Virginia. The museum was founded in 1933 as the Norfolk Museum of Arts and Sciences.  In 1971, automotive heir, Walter P. Chrysler Jr. (whose wife, Jean Outland Chrysler, was a native of Norfolk), donated most of his extensive collection to the museum. This single gift significantly expanded the museum's collection, making it one of the major art museums in the Southeastern United States. From 1958 to 1971, the Chrysler Museum of Art was a smaller museum consisting solely of Chrysler's personal collection and housed in the historic Center Methodist Church in Provincetown, Massachusetts.  Today's museum sits on a small body of water known as The Hague.

Expansion and renovation
The museum's main building underwent expansion and renovation and reopened on May 10, 2014. During the renovation, the Glass Studio and the Moses Myers House remained open and art was displayed at venues throughout the community. The museum's grand reopening included the Rubber Duck floating sculpture from May 17–26, 2014. The museum originally had a courtyard, but during renovations in the 1980s, the courtyard was enclosed, creating Huber Court. Concerts and events are held in Huber Court.

Collection
The New York Times described the Chrysler collection as "one any museum in the world would kill for." Comprising over 30,000 objects, the collection spans over 5,000 years of world history. American and European paintings and sculpture from the Middle Ages to the present day form the core of the collection.

The museum's most significant holdings include works by Tintoretto, Veronese, Peter Paul Rubens, Diego Velázquez, Salvator Rosa, Gianlorenzo Bernini, John Singleton Copley, Thomas Cole, Eugène Delacroix, Édouard Manet, Paul Cézanne, Gustave Doré, Albert Bierstadt, Auguste Rodin, Mary Cassatt, Paul Gauguin, Georges Rouault, Henri Matisse, Georges Braque, Edward Hopper, Jackson Pollock, Andy Warhol, Richard Diebenkorn, Karen LaMonte and Franz Kline.

The Chrysler Museum is home to the final sculpture of the Baroque master Gianlorenzo Bernini, a marble bust of Jesus Christ created as a gift for the artist's benefactor, Queen Christina of Sweden. The Museum also houses one of the world's greatest collections of glass (including outstanding works by Louis Comfort Tiffany), distinguished holdings in the decorative arts, and a fine and growing collection of photography. The arts of the ancient world, Asia, Africa, and Pre-Columbian America (particularly Maya ceramics) are also well represented.

Selected collection highlights

Programs and exhibitions

The Chrysler Museum provides guided tours, lectures, films, concerts, family days, story time in the galleries, travel programs, and publications. More than 60,000 students from Hampton Roads' schools tour the museum each year. Their visits are facilitated by a team of around 100 volunteer docents, who also offer a variety of general and special tours for the public. The Chrysler docent training program is a selective, rigorous, year-long course. Established docents continue their training through a variety continuing education activities.

The Chrysler displays its permanent collection and several changing exhibitions including works from around the globe. Recent offerings include Rembrandt's Etchings: The Embrace and Darkness of Light, From Goya to Sorolla: Masterpieces from The Hispanic Society of America, To Conserve a Legacy: American Art from Historically Black Colleges and Universities, Rodin: Sculpture from the Iris and B. Gerald Cantor Collection and American Chronicles: The Art of Norman Rockwell.

Jean Outland Chrysler Library
The Jean Outland Chrysler Library is one of the largest art libraries in the South. The collection covers the entire history of world art, with special emphasis on material relevant to the Chrysler's permanent collection. The library subscribes to several hundred art-related journals, has an extensive collection of current and historical auction catalogues, and exchanges publications with 400 art museums around the world.

The library is named in honor of Jean Outland Chrysler, wife of the late Walter P. Chrysler, Jr., who played a leading role in its formation and expansion. The collection is based on the original holdings of the Norfolk Museum of Arts and Sciences library. In 1977, the library of the London art dealer M. Knoedler & Co. was purchased, adding major historical reference volumes, periodicals, and rare annotated sales catalogues. The library also houses the museum's archives, which includes Mark Twain's original typescript of a speech he delivered at the Jamestown Tricentennial Exposition of 1907, and a collection of papers from the Moses Myers family provides unique insights into the life of an important Tidewater merchant during the United States' early history.

The Jean Outland Chrysler Library  moved from the Chrysler Museum of Art into a new art building on Old Dominion University campus in 2014.

Historic houses
In addition to its main building in downtown Norfolk, the Chrysler Museum of Art administers two important historic houses.

Moses Myers House

The Moses Myers House in downtown Norfolk is an example of Federal period architecture and retains 70 percent of its original contents. The house and its furnishings allow visitors to experience first-hand the life of a prosperous Jewish merchant and his family during the early 19th century. Moses Myers moved to Norfolk in 1787 with his wife Eliza. Five years later, he purchased a large lot where he erected a home for his family. Today the house contains an important collection of American, English and French furniture, glass, silver, ceramics, and portraits by Gilbert Stuart, Thomas Sully, and John Wesley Jarvis. All were commissioned or acquired by members of the Myers family.

The house was built about 1792 and is a two-story, Federal style brick townhouse. Its facade features a pedimented gable end roof and a small aedicula type portico surrounding the front door. In 1796, a two-story octagonal ended wing attributed to Benjamin H. Latrobe was added to the rear of the house to contain a large dining room. Also on the rear are a two-story service wing and an attached two-story kitchen. A historic renovation of the house occurred in 1906 in anticipation of the Jamestown Exposition. The house was converted to a house museum in 1931.

It was listed on the National Register of Historic Places in 1970, with an amendment made in 2009.

In October 2022, the council of City of Norfolk, which owns the property, voted to proceed with the possibility of selling it, conjecturing the entirety of the property--the main house, the attached dwelling of the Myers’ enslaved servants, and the historic garden--could be sold as part of a package to developers, perhaps to operate as a bed and breakfast. Multiple entities, including the Norfolk Historical Society, have expressed distress and outrage.

Norfolk History Museum at the Willoughby-Baylor House

The Norfolk History Museum at the Willoughby-Baylor House (ca. 1794)  has been closed since 2020.
It illuminated the history of the region by providing thematic offerings and surveys including the decorative arts of Norfolk, stages in Norfolk's story as an international port and maritime center, and the area's naval and military heritage.

References

External links
Chrysler Museum of Art Official Website
Virtual tour of the Chrysler Museum of Art provided by Google Arts & Culture
Chrysler Museum of Art Glass Studio
Cosmopolitan Makeover for a Tidewater Backwater - New York Times
Official Paper Model

Houses on the National Register of Historic Places in Virginia
Art museums and galleries in Virginia
Institutions accredited by the American Alliance of Museums
Museums in Norfolk, Virginia
Historic house museums in Virginia
History museums in Virginia
Art museums established in 1933
1933 establishments in Virginia
National Register of Historic Places in Norfolk, Virginia
Benjamin Henry Latrobe buildings and structures
Asian art museums in the United States
Mesoamerican art museums in the United States
Egyptological collections in the United States
Museums of American art
Museums of ancient Greece in the United States
Museums of ancient Rome in the United States
Houses in Norfolk, Virginia